Trocadero may refer to:

 Trocadéro, an area of Paris, France

Buildings 
 Palais du Trocadéro, built for the 1878 World's Fair in Paris, France
 Trocadero, Birmingham, a pub in England
 Trocadero (Los Angeles), a 1930s ballroom and a modern nightclub in California, U.S.
 Trocadero, Newtown, a heritage-listed former dance hall in Sydney, New South Wales, Australia
 Trocadero, San Francisco, a roadhouse in California, U.S.
 London Trocadero, an 1896 restaurant, now a shopping complex
 Sydney Trocadero, a dance and concert hall opened in 1936 in New South Wales, Australia
 Trocadero Ballroom (1917–1975), at Elitch Gardens, Denver, Colorado, U.S.
 Trocadero Hotel (Bangkok), a former hotel on Surawong Road in Bangkok
 Trocadero Theatre, now a concert hall and dance club in Philadelphia, Pennsylvania, U.S.
 Trocadero Transfer, a former nightclub in San Francisco

Entertainment 
 Trocadero (1900 film), part of the film series Paris Exposition, 1900 by Georges Méliès
 Trocadero (1944 film), an American film directed by William Nigh
 Trocadero (band), an American alternative rock band 
 "Trocadero", a song by the British rock and roll band Showaddywaddy

Other uses 
 Trocadero (drink), a soft drink popular in Sweden
 Trocadéro (Paris Métro), a Paris Métro station
 Battle of Trocadero, an 1823 battle in southern Spain between the French army and Spanish revolutionaries
 French ship Trocadéro (1824), a ship of the line
 Isla del Trocadero, the site of the 1823 battle

See also
Les Ballets Trockadero de Monte Carlo, an American all-male drag ballet company